"Joy" is a 1971 instrumental pop hit record by Apollo 100. It is a contemporary rendition of a 1723 composition by Johann Sebastian Bach entitled "Jesu, Joy of Man's Desiring", shortened to simply "Joy".

The song reached number 6 on the U.S. Billboard Hot 100 in January 1972 and number 2 on the Adult Contemporary chart. In Canada, "Joy" reached number 24.  It is ranked as the 71st biggest U.S. hit of 1972.

Chart history

Weekly charts

Year-end charts

Other versions
The Ventures released a version of "Joy" in 1972. They reached number 109 on the U.S. Billboard pop chart.

References

External links
  
 
 

1971 songs
1971 singles
1970s instrumentals
Pop instrumentals
Mega Records singles